Rafael da Silva Gomes (born 1 October 1987), commonly known as Rafael, is a Brazilian footballer who plays as a defender.

Career statistics

Club

Notes

References

1991 births
Living people
Brazilian footballers
Brazilian expatriate footballers
Association football defenders
Associação Jaguaré Esporte Clube players
Al-Hilal Club (Omdurman) players
Mqabba F.C. players
Żebbuġ Rangers F.C. players
Maltese Challenge League players
Expatriate footballers in Sudan
Brazilian expatriate sportspeople in Malta
Expatriate footballers in Malta
People from Jaboatão dos Guararapes
Sportspeople from Pernambuco
21st-century Brazilian people